Anita Mai Tan is a Canadian jewelry designer who is currently the owner and main designer of AlGems. She has designed  rings, necklaces, smartphone cases, wine decanters and luxury pens. Anita has designed products for charitable causes, including a Dragon and Spider iPhone case necklace that was valued at approximately $880,000 for a charity auction to help youth with low income to remain at school . Her Dragon decanter contains 2,000 grams of 18K gold and encrusted with diamonds and gemstones for a total of 72 carats. Her work has been carried by one of the Japan's international department store Mitsukoshi Ltd.

In 2010, she designed her first luxury pen cover in diamond and gold. The body of the pen is made of gold and adorned with 48 carats of diamonds (1,888 gems). The pen is priced at €688,000 (approximately $1.01 million). She also designed a pair of luxury iPhone cases, the Dragon and Spider phone case. Both cases are made in 18K gold. The Dragon case consists of 2,200 colorless and colored diamonds (cognac, brown, champagne) with total weight of 32 carats while the spider case covered with an array of 2,800 colorless and black diamonds for a total weight of 38 carats.

In many of her works, Anita uses animal figures (dragon, horse, spider) as well as floral patterns. The numbers of stones deliberately match certain numbers with auspicious connotations in Chinese culture such the numbers nine (leadership, the ability to see clearly), 22 (easy), 28 (easy gaining wealth), 32 (born lucky) or 38 (worn wealth).

References

External links
ALGEM website

Living people
Canadian jewellery designers
Gemologists
Year of birth missing (living people)
Women jewellers